The Fondation Napoléon is a foundation, registered as a French non-profit organization (reconnue d'utilité publique) on November 12, 1987. Its mission is to encourage and support study and interest in the history of the First ,and Second French Empires and to support the preservation of Napoleonic Heritage.

Mission and activities 
The Foundation Napoléon promotes research on the history of the two French Empires, most notably by awarding six research grants to Ph.D. candidates in French and non-French.  It also awards annual History Prizes
 for outstanding works on subjects related to the two French Empires (in French and other European languages). The Foundation also helps to organize academic conferences, bicentennial and sesquicentennial commemorations, Napoleonic book publishing, and exhibition catalogues.

Save Longwood, Napoleon's House on St Helena 
In December 2010, the Foundation launched an international appeal to save Napoleon's house on the island of St Helena. The funds collected were to be used to pay for the restoration of the buildings in which Napoleon and his entourage lived in exile on St Helena from 1815 to 1821. The appeal is supported by the French Ministry of Foreign Affairs.

Opposition to the removal of the Statue of Napoleon in Rouen 
In September 2020, the mayor of Rouen, Nicolas Mayer-Rossignol (Socialist), wished to replace the statue of Napoleon with a statue or work of art dedicated to the recently deceased feminist Gisèle Halimi. The plans were strongly opposed by the leader of the city's opposition, Jean-François Bures. Historian Thierry Lentz, director of the Foundation Napoléon, called the plans "cancel culture" and argued that Napoleon was a benefactor of Rouen, making him more locally relevant than Halimi. In December 2021, a survey of 4,080 residents found that 68% wanted the statue to remain, and the city council said it would respect the result. Later in December 2021, the statue was registered as a monument historique.

Publication of the General Correspondence of Napoleon Bonaparte 
In 2002, the Fondation launched its grand project to publish the most complete version ever of the General Correspondence of Napoleon I (fifteen volumes completed by 2018). This project is in partnership with the French Archives nationales, the French Archives du Ministère des Affaires étrangères, and with the support of the Fondation La Poste. The end result will be the publication of fourteen volumes and more than 40,000 letters, all with commentary and checked as much as possible against originals in public and private collections. Volume 8, containing letters for the year 1808 and the war in Spain, was published in November 2011 by Editions Fayard.

Libraries, web sites and e-review

Libraries 
 The Napoleonic Digital Library (online since 2010) - downloadable e-texts (books, offprints, etc.)
 The Fondation Napoléon's library, the Bibliothèque Martial-Lapeyre / Fondation Napoléon, open to the general public.

Websites 
 napoleon.org (founded in 1996), provides the general public with accurate details on the history of the First and Second Empires (articles, close-ups, biographies, image database...) and a Magazine (Just published, Interviews, What's on...). This site is entirely bi-lingual (English/French) and updated daily. The Bibliothèque Martial-Lapeyre library catalogue can be accessed from this site. A weekly news bulletin keeps readers up to date.
 napoleonica.org, founded in 1999, hosts digitised archival documents related to the history of France's First Empire: Archives of the French Conseil d'État (Council of State), Correspondence of Vivant Denon (first director of the Louvre Museum), documents related to the Proclamation of the First Empire, etc.

E-review 
Napoleonica La Revue (founded in 2008) is a bi-lingual international peer-review periodical of articles on the two Napoleonic empires. It is hosted by Cairn.info

Art and historical memorabilia collection 
The Fondation Napoléon organises exhibitions of its collection of fine art and historical memorabilia, etc. (Exhibitions includes Paris (2004),  São Paulo, (2003) Brazil, Monterrey Mexico (2005), Minden (2006) Germany ) and loans items from the collection to prestigious exhibition worldwide. For details, see the Press packs.

Notes and references

External links 
 
 Napoleonica.org, the Fondation Napoléon's website of Napoleonic historical archival material
 Website of the history society, the Souvenir Napoléonien

Historical societies of France
Non-profit organizations based in France
Organizations established in 1987